Lauka is a village in Hiiumaa Parish, Hiiu County on the island of Hiiumaa in northwestern Estonia.

References

 

Villages in Hiiu County